Jan Werner may refer to:
Jan Werner Danielsen (1976–2006), Norwegian pop rock singer
Jan Werner (athlete) (1946–2014), Polish athlete